Max Duggan (born March 12, 2001) is an American football quarterback for the TCU Horned Frogs. He won several national awards after leading TCU to the 2023 College Football Playoff National Championship.

Early years
Duggan was born on March 12, 2001, in Council Bluffs, Iowa.  His two older siblings, Sam and Megan, were both adopted from South Korea.

At Lewis Central High School, Duggan played football, baseball, basketball and ran track.  On the football field, he was coached by his father and was four-year starter at quarterback.  As a senior, he passed for 2,130 yards and 24 touchdowns while adding another 1,223 yards and 25 touchdowns on the ground on his way to being named the 2018 Iowa Gatorade High School Player of the Year.

Rated as a 4-star prospect, Duggan was ranked as the top recruit in Iowa for the Class of 2019.  Despite scholarship offers from regional programs Nebraska, Iowa and Iowa State, national powers like Georgia, Ohio State and Penn State as well as his favorite team from childhood, Notre Dame, Duggan chose to play his college football at Texas Christian University in Fort Worth, Texas, announcing his commitment to the Horned Frogs via Twitter.  He graduated from Lewis Central a semester early in order to enroll at TCU in January 2019.

College career

2019 
Duggan's collegiate debut came in the Frogs' 2019 season opener, a 39–7 home victory over Arkansas-Pine Bluff when he came on in relief of starter Alex Delton late in the first quarter, scoring his first career rushing touchdown on his first possession.  His first career touchdown pass came in the second half on a 37-yard strike to Jalen Reagor.  He made his first career start three weeks later in a game against SMU, becoming just the second true freshman to start at quarterback under longtime TCU coach Gary Patterson.  In late October, he scored the game-winning touchdown on an 11-yard run with less than two minutes remaining as TCU upset 15th-ranked Texas, 37–27.  He ended his first season having thrown for a school freshman record 2,077 yards and 15 touchdowns.

2020 
Prior to Duggan's sophomore season in 2020, a medical screening that was part of enhanced safety protocols associated with the COVID-19 pandemic revealed that he had been born with Wolff–Parkinson–White syndrome, a condition that affects the electrical system of the heart.  Two days after undergoing a nine-hour surgery to fix the issue, he returned to the hospital with a blood clot and underwent an additional, emergency surgery. Despite these medical ordeals, he was ready to play in the Frogs' 2020 season opener, throwing for 241 yards and three touchdowns against Iowa State.  A week later in a road game against 9th-ranked Texas, Duggan once again sealed an upset win over the Longhorns with his legs as he scored from 26 yards out late in the fourth quarter in the 33-31 TCU victory.  Beginning with a road win over Baylor on Halloween, Duggan led the Frogs to wins in five of their last six contests - highlighted by his 369 yards of total offense (265 passing, 104 rushing) in a 29–22 home victory over 15th-ranked Oklahoma State. TCU accepted an invitation to play Arkansas in the Texas Bowl, but the game was canceled as part of the second wave of the pandemic.  Duggan ended the 10-game, shortened season with 1,795 yards and 10 touchdowns passing - and with 526 yards on the ground and 10 rushing touchdowns, became the first TCU quarterback to lead the team in rushing since Gil Bartosh in 1950.

2021 
Duggan's junior campaign was a frustrating time for the TCU program and him personally.  He did throw for a career-best 346 yards and 4 touchdowns against 4th-ranked Oklahoma, but he was hampered by injuries for much of the season as he played through a broken bone and torn tendons in one of his feet. In a late October road loss against Kansas State that dropped the Frogs' record to 3–5, Duggan was benched when his injuries severely limited his productivity.  The next day, Patterson's tenure at TCU came to an abrupt halt and interim coach Jerry Kill took over for the remainder of the season.  While Duggan was out, backup Chandler Morris threw for 461 yards in leading TCU to a 30–28 upset victory over 12th-ranked Baylor.  After TCU hired Sonny Dykes as their new head coach in November, speculation that Morris' performance against Baylor could signal the end of Duggan's time as the Frogs' starting quarterback increased when Dykes told reporters that there would be open competition for the job going into 2022.

2022 
In August, the quarterback competition that lasted throughout the spring and summer ended when Dykes and offensive coordinator Garrett Riley informed Duggan that Morris would be the starter. Rather than entering the transfer portal to find a new program, Duggan elected to remain at TCU and told Dykes that he intended to be the best backup quarterback in the country and that he'd do anything to help Morris succeed.  With the Frogs leading 17–6 in the 3rd quarter of the season-opener at Colorado, Morris injured his knee.  Duggan came on in relief, leading the Frogs on two touchdown drives to pull away, 38–13.

After throwing for a career-high 390 yards in a win over Tarleton State and going on the road to reclaim the Iron Skillet from crosstown rival SMU to finish the non-conference schedule 3–0, Duggan and the Frogs made a statement with a resounding 55–24 victory over 18th-ranked Oklahoma. With 302 yards and 3 touchdowns passing and 116 yards and 2 touchdowns rushing, Duggan earned Big 12 Offensive Player of the Week honors.  In each of the next three weeks, Duggan led the Frogs to come-from-behind victories - first on the road at 19th-ranked Kansas with a last-minute, game-winning 24-yard touchdown pass to Quentin Johnston and then overcoming double-digit deficits at home against both 8th-ranked Oklahoma State in double overtime and 17th-ranked Kansas State to reach 7–0.

In November, Duggan and TCU defeated in-state rivals Texas Tech, 18th-ranked Texas and Baylor in consecutive weeks to reach 11–0.  In the game against Baylor, the Frogs trailed by 8 late in the 4th quarter.  After a touchdown to pull within 2 and a quick stop by the TCU defense to get the ball back with 1:30 on the clock and no timeouts, Duggan led a 54-yard drive to get into field goal range - setting up a dramatic final sequence in which the TCU field goal unit ran onto the field with the clock running before kicker Griffin Kell connected on a game-winning 40-yard field goal that left the McLane Stadium crowd stunned; the TCU fans in attendance cheered in excitement after the field goal was good.

After a home win over Iowa State that made Duggan the first quarterback to lead TCU to a perfect 12-0 regular season since Andy Dalton in 2010, the Frogs were set for a rematch with Kansas State in the 2022 Big 12 Championship Game.  Down by 11 in the 4th quarter, Duggan led TCU on yet another comeback, scoring on an 8-yard touchdown run with 1:51 remaining to put him over 100 rushing yards for the game and connected with tight end Jared Wiley on the 2-point conversion to force overtime.  The Wildcats prevailed in OT - but the next day, 12-1 TCU became the first team from the state of Texas to be selected to play in the College Football Playoff.  They defeated 2nd-ranked Michigan in the Fiesta Bowl on December 31.

Duggan's accolades for the season include becoming the first Horned Frog to be named Big 12 Offensive Player of the Year since Trevone Boykin in 2014 and the first TCU player to win the Davey O'Brien Award (named after former TCU quarterback Davey O'Brien) and the Johnny Unitas Golden Arm Award.  On December 6, he became the first TCU player since LaDainian Tomlinson in 2000 to be named a finalist for the Heisman Trophy. He would finish second in the Heisman voting, behind Caleb Williams from USC.

On December 18, 2022, Duggan announced he would forego his remaining college eligibility and declare for the 2023 NFL Draft. He will still start for the Horned Frogs in the College Football Playoff.

In the College Football Playoff, they beat the heavy favorites Michigan Michigan Wolverines 51-45 in the Fiesta Bowl. He went 14 of 29, threw for 225 yards, and 2 touchdowns and 2 interceptions. TCU lost to the Georgia Bulldogs in the College Football Playoff National Championship 65-7. Duggan was 14/22, passing for 152 yards, throwing no touchdowns, 2 interceptions and rushing for the only TCU touchdown.

Statistics

References

External links
 
 TCU Horned Frogs bio

2001 births
Living people
American football quarterbacks
Players of American football from Iowa
Sportspeople from Council Bluffs, Iowa
TCU Horned Frogs football players